The 2015 Los Angeles elections were held on March 3, 2015, in Los Angeles, California. Voters elected candidates in a nonpartisan primary, with runoff elections scheduled for May 19, 2015. Seven of the fifteen seats in the City Council were up for election.

Municipal elections in California are officially nonpartisan; candidates' party affiliations do not appear on the ballot.

City Council

District 2

District 4

District 6

District 8

District 10

District 12

District 14

References

External links 
 Office of the City Clerk, City of Los Angeles

Los Angeles
2015
Los Angeles